I Got Rhythm is a studio album by American jazz pianist Teddy Wilson featuring performances recorded in 1956 for the Verve label.

Track listing
 "Stompin' at the Savoy" (Edgar Sampson, Benny Goodman, Andy Razaf, Chick Webb) - 4:12
 "Say It Isn't So"  (Irving Berlin) - 2:44
 "All of Me" (Gerald Marks, Seymour Simons) - 3:00 		
 "Stars Fell on Alabama" (Frank Perkins\. Mitchell Parish) - 3:08
 "I Got Rhythm" (George Gershwin, Ira Gershwin) - 3:37
 "On the Sunny Side of the Street" (Jimmy McHugh, Dorothy Fields) - 3:20
 "Sweet Georgia Brown" (Ben Bernie, Maceo Pinkard, Kenneth Casey) - 2:45
 "As Time Goes By" (Herman Hupfeld) - 3:10
 "Smiles" ( J. Will Callahan, Lee Roberts) - 3:27 		
 "When Your Lover Has Gone" (Einar Aaron Swan) - 3:15
 "Limehouse Blues" (Philip Braham, Douglas Furber) - 4:07 		
 "Blues for Daryl" (Teddy Wilson) - 3:34
 "You're Driving Me Crazy" (Walter Donaldson) - 3:15

Personnel
Teddy Wilson - piano 
Gene Ramey – bass
Jo Jones - drums

References

Verve Records albums
Teddy Wilson albums
1956 albums
Albums produced by Norman Granz